The Teacher of Righteousness (in Hebrew: מורה הצדק Moreh ha-Tzedek) is a figure found in some of the Dead Sea Scrolls at Qumran, most prominently in the Damascus Document. This document speaks briefly of the origins of the sect, probably Essenes, 390 years after the reign of Nebuchadnezzar and after 20 years of "groping" blindly for the way. "God... raised for them a Teacher of Righteousness to guide them in the way of His heart". 

The Teacher is extolled as having proper understanding of the Torah, qualified in its accurate instruction, and being the one through whom God would reveal to the community "the hidden things in which Israel had gone astray".

Although the exact identity of the Teacher is unknown, based on the text of the Community Rule scroll, the teachers of the sect are identified as Kohens (priests) of patrilineal progeny of Zadok (the first high priest to serve in Solomon's Temple), leading scholars to assume the Teacher as a Kohen (priest) of Tzadokite lineage.

Identity

The "missing" High Priest of 159–152 BCE 
One theory initially advocated by Jerome Murphy-O'Connor and subsequently by Stegemann is that the Teacher of Righteousness served as High Priest but was subsequently ousted by Jonathan Apphus. In 1 Maccabees, no High Priest is named for the period from the death of Alcimus in 159 BCE to the claiming of the position of High Priest by Jonathan on the authority of Alexander Balas in 152 BCE (1 Macc 10:18–20). From this it could be concluded that there was no High Priest for these years, and indeed Josephus, drawing heavily on 1 Maccabees at this point in his history, comes to that conclusion (Ant. 20.237). It is improbable, however, that the office remained completely vacant for these years. Stegemann suggests that the reason that nothing is said in 1 Maccabees about a High Priest between Alcimus and Jonathan was apologetic: to conceal the fact that the Hasmoneans obtained the High Priesthood by usurping it from its rightful holder, the Teacher of Righteousness. Alvar Ellegård follows this line and argues that the Teacher of Righteousness was not only the leader of the Essenes at Qumran, but was also considered something of a precursor to Jesus Christ about 150 years before the time of the Gospels.
In 1965 the Dead Sea Scrolls document known as  Melchizedek  dated to around 100 BC reveals the Essenes were waiting for this Mechizedek ( King of Righteousness ) High Priest and King Messiah. The Essenes also write in this document that they knew the time of his appearing due to the prophecies written in Daniel.

Critics of this theory accuse it of being too hypothetical: slotting the Teacher as High Priest into a convenient gap during which no other High Priest is recorded in the few sources available. Neither the Damascus Document, nor 1QS or 4QMMT suggest that the legitimacy of the High Priest was an issue for the split. In addition, the motivation behind the split of the sect from mainstream Judaism appears to have been of a religious rather than political nature.

A 1st-century BCE Messiah figure 

Michael O. Wise posits that the Teacher of Righteousness was the "first messiah", a figure predating Jesus by roughly 100 years. This figure – who Wise believes was named Judah – rose to prominence during the reign of Alexander Jannaeus, and had been a priest and confidant to the king. However, he became dissatisfied with the religious sects in Jerusalem and, in reaction, founded a "crisis cult". While amassing a following, the Teacher (and his followers) claimed he was the fulfillment of various Biblical prophecies, with an emphasis on those found in Isaiah. The Teacher was eventually killed by the religious leadership in Jerusalem, and his followers hailed him as messianic figure who had been exalted to the presence of God's throne. They then anticipated that the Teacher would return to judge the wicked and lead the righteous into a golden age, and that it would take place within the next forty years. Wise explains that dating of manuscript copies among the Dead Sea Scrolls shows that the Teacher's postmortem following drastically increased in size over several years, but that when the predicted return and golden age failed to materialize, his following dissipated rapidly.

A Sadducee priest 
Other documents from the Dead Sea Scrolls portray the Teacher as involved in heavy conflict against a figure termed the "Wicked Priest", which has led to several proposals for their identity: A Sadducee (Zadokite) priest as the Teacher, possibly even the legitimate high priest, against a "wicked" Jonathan Apphus. "Zadok" in Hebrew (צדוק) translates as "righteous."

Hyrcanus II
Somewhat along these lines is the proposal that Hyrcanus II was the Teacher of Righteousness. This was proposed in 2013 by Gregory Doudna. Hyrcanus was the high priest of the Temple from 76 to 67 BCE and from 63 to 40 BCE. According to Doudna, Hyrcanus II’s sectarian orientation is now generally understood to have been Sadducee.

Further, according to this hypothesis, Antigonus Mattathias would have been seen as the Wicked Priest. Antigonus was the last Hasmonean king of Israel. He ruled only for 3 years, and was executed by the Romans in 37 BCE. Antigonus was supported by the Pharisees.

Hillel against Shammai 
Rabbi Harvey Falk identifies Hillel the Elder as the Teacher, against a "wicked" Shammai, a significant conflict mentioned in the Talmud (Jerusalem Talmud Shabbat 1:4). Most scholars date the Damascus Document and many of the Dead Sea scrolls to the decades around the year 100 BCE, vastly predating Hillel and Shammai.

James is Jesus, Teacher of Righteousness
Robert Eisenman has proposed the historical Jesus was actually the Nazarene James, the Teacher of Righteousness against a "Wicked Priest" (Ananus ben Ananus), and a "Spouter of Lies" which Eisenman identifies as Paul of Tarsus. This theory is rejected by mainstream scholarship.

Judah the Essene 

Stephen Goranson suggests that Judah the Essene, mentioned by Josephus, is the Teacher.

John the Baptist
Barbara Thiering questions the dating of the Dead Sea Scrolls and suggests that the Teacher of Righteousness preached coming fiery judgment, said "the axe is laid to the roots of the tree", called people "vipers", practiced baptism and lived in the wilderness of Judea. Due to these reasons, she believes there is a strong possibility that the Teacher of Righteousness was John the Baptist.

More than one Teacher of Righteousness
Richard A. Freund writes "The difference of opinion over the positioning of the Teacher of Righteousness leads me to conclude that perhaps all of these researchers are correct. A Teacher of Righteousness did lead the group in the second century BCE when it was established. Another Teacher of Righteousness led the sect in the first century BCE and finally another Teacher emerged in the first century CE."

See also 
 Essenes

References 

2nd-century BCE High Priests of Israel
Dead Sea Scrolls
2nd-century BC clergy
Unidentified people